The Chi Machine is a passive aerobic exercise device, developed and first manufactured in Japan by Skylite Industry company president and engineer, Keiichi Ohashi, in 1988. The Chi Machine was granted a patent by the Japanese Patent Office December 18, 1990 which expired in 2010. The machine was originally known as Sun Harmony and later changed to Sun Ancon.

In 1927, Katsuzo Nishi created the Nishi Health System, a series of six exercises, one of which (kingyō undō) was the basis for the motion of the modern day Chi Machine. This specific exercise was adopted in Aikido and is known as "goldfish exercise".

Marketing and Classification 
The Sun Ancon Chi Machine holds US FDA approval as a Class 1 Therapeutic Massager, Regulation #890.5660 Proprietary Name Chi Machine and is registered as a medical device in Canada 66598, Australia L 81810 and Japan 02B 0694.

Clinical Trials 
In June 2000, HTE contracted with Flinders University in Adelaide, South Australia to conduct clinical trials focusing on secondary lymphedema and venous oedema of the legs. Results showed an average reduction in test subjects' weight of 1.45 kg (approx 3 lbs) in 3 weeks. The results showed that "after a three week treatment period there were statistically significant reductions in total leg volume and fluids, whole body extracellular fluid, weight and subjective leg symptoms."

References

Bibliography

Exercise equipment